Bodaw Chit Mi was one of two principal queens of King Bayin Htwe of Prome. She was the mother of King Minkhaung of Prome, and a great grandmother of Natshinnaung, the last king of the breakaway kingdom of Toungoo.

Ancestry
The following is her ancestry as reported in the Hmannan Yazawin chronicle, which in turn referenced contemporary inscriptions. Her parents were uncle and niece.

Notes

References

Bibliography
 
 

Prome dynasty